Stave Falls is a rural community located in northwestern Mission, British Columbia, Canada.

See also
Stave Lake
Rolley Lake Provincial Park
Stave Falls Dam

References 
 Mission Museum

External links
Stave Falls Visitor Center old powerhouse
BC Hydro recreation areas

Stave Falls Artist Group
"Clarke's Estate General Store", HeritagePlaces.com site (Mission Museum & Community Archives)

Lower Mainland
Mission, British Columbia